Beeb or BEEB may refer to:

 BBC, the British Broadcasting Corporation, sometimes called the Beeb or Auntie Beeb
 BEEB, a BBC children's magazine published in 1985
 BBC Micro, a home computer built for the BBC by Acorn Computers Ltd., nicknamed The Beeb
 Beeb.com or BBC online
 Beeb Birtles (born 1948), Dutch-Australian musician

See also
 Bebe (disambiguation)
 Beebe (disambiguation)
 The Bieb